Minatsu Murase (born 23 June 1995) is a Swedish retired ice hockey goaltender who represented Sweden in the women's ice hockey tournament at the 2018 Winter Olympics in PyeongChang. She last played in the Swedish Women's Hockey League (SDHL) with AIK Hockey Dam during the 2021–22 season.

Playing career 
Murase played her first regular season in the Riksserien (renamed SDHL in 2016) in 2012, as a 17-year-old, with AIK. The following year, she would win the starting job as the club won the SDHL championship. She was named Best Goaltender of the Riksserien for the 2015–16 season.

Murase missed most of 2018–19 season due to pregnancy. In the summer of 2019, she left AIK to sign with Luleå HF/MSSK.

In January 2020, Murase announced that she was leaving Luleå and joining HC Örnen in the men's Hockeyettan as they competed for promotion to HockeyAllsvenskan. She did not play during the following season, as she was pregnant with her second child.

Murase made her return to the SDHL for the 2021–22 season, announcing a one year contract with AIK in April 2021.

She officially retired after the 2021–22 season, explaining that trying to balance playing elite ice hockey and caring for her two young children wasn’t sustainable in a healthy way, particularly since she could not make a living as a player.

International 
She was named Best Goaltender at the 2013 IIHF World Women's U18 Championship, as Sweden won bronze.

She competed in the 2018 Winter Olympics.

Personal life 

Murase and her partner, professional ice hockey forward Robin Kovács, have three children – born in October 2018, September 2020, and November 2022.

References

External links
 
 

1995 births
Living people
Swedish women's ice hockey goaltenders
Ice hockey people from Stockholm
Ice hockey players at the 2018 Winter Olympics
Olympic ice hockey players of Sweden
Luleå HF/MSSK players